In the 2014–15 season, USM Alger competed in the Ligue 1 for the 37th season, as well as the Algerian Cup.  It was their 20th consecutive season in the top flight of Algerian football. The club also competed in the CAF Champions League, the Algerian Super Cup and the Algerian Cup. The club was managed by Hubert Velud, until his sacking on 1 February 2015. He was replaced by Otto Pfister on 19 February.  On May 18, Pfister was sacked as coach of USM Alger.

Pre-season

Mid-season

Competitions

Overview

Ligue 1

League table

Results summary

Results by round

Matches

Algerian Cup

Algerian Super Cup

Champions League

Preliminary round

First round

Second round

Squad information

Playing statistics

Appearances (Apps.) numbers are for appearances in competitive games only including sub appearances
Red card numbers denote:   Numbers in parentheses represent red cards overturned for wrongful dismissal.

Goalscorers
Includes all competitive matches. The list is sorted alphabetically by surname when total goals are equal.

Assists table

Last updated: 3 April 2015

Suspensions

Penalties

Clean sheets 
Includes all competitive matches.

Overall seasonal record
Note: Games which are level after extra-time and are decided by a penalty shoot-out are listed as draws.

Squad list
Players and squad numbers last updated on 29 May 2015.Note: Flags indicate national team as has been defined under FIFA eligibility rules. Players may hold more than one non-FIFA nationality.

Transfers

In

Out

References

USM Alger seasons
Algerian football clubs 2014–15 season